The Colombian Rugby Federation ( or FCR in Spanish) is the governing body for rugby union in Colombia. The FCR is a member of World Rugby, the governing body for rugby globally, and a member of Sudamérica Rugby, the governing body for rugby in South America.

The FCR also oversees the Colombia national rugby union team, which participates in the annual South American Rugby Championship. The national team has been ranked as high as 34 in 2017 and as low as 85 in 2006.

See also 
 Rugby union in Colombia
 Colombia national rugby union team
 Colombia national rugby sevens team

References

External links
 Official site

Rugby in Colombia